Conisania leineri is a species of moth of the family Noctuidae. It is found in Central Europe, along the Baltic Sea coast, eastward to the southern Ural.

The wingspan is 29–36 mm. Adults are on wing from May to July in one generation per year. Adults feed on the flower nectar of Syringa species.

The young larvae feed on roots and stems of various Artemisia species, including Artemisia campestris. Larvae are found in July and August. They overwinter as a pupa.

Subspecies
Conisania leineri leineri
Conisania leineri furcata (Eversmann, 1837)
Conisania leineri pomerana (Schulz, 1869)

References

External links

Lepiforum.de
schmetterlinge-deutschlands.de

Moths described in 1836
Hadenini
Moths of Europe
Taxa named by Christian Friedrich Freyer